Jorge Antonio Giordano Moreno (born 27 February 1965) is a Uruguayan football manager and former player who played as a midfielder.

Career
In June 2019, Giordano was hires as technical secretary of Nacional.

Honours
Fénix
Uruguayan Segunda División: 2008–09

References

External links
 
 

1965 births
Living people
People from Florida Department
Uruguayan footballers
Association football midfielders
Liverpool F.C. (Montevideo) players
Villa Española players
Uruguayan football managers
Centro Atlético Fénix managers
Danubio F.C. managers
Rampla Juniors managers
Racing Club de Montevideo managers
Club Nacional de Football managers
River Plate Montevideo managers
Montevideo Wanderers managers
Juventud de Las Piedras managers